Percis matsuii is a fish in the family Agonidae.</ref> It was described by Matsubara in 1936. It is a marine, deep water-dwelling fish which is known from southern Japan, in the northwestern Pacific Ocean.

Due to its moderately wide distribution in its region, and due to a lack of interest from fisheries, the IUCN redlist currently lists P. matsuii as Least Concern.

References

matsui
Taxa named by Kiyomatsu Matsubara
Fish described in 1936